Håkon Adelstein Mosling (born 16 April 1840, died 7 October 1914) was a Norwegian builder and architect. 

Mosling lived in several places, including Trondheim (1865-1873), Steinkjer (1874-1894), and Oslo (1894-1914). As part of his architectural practice, he also operated as a builder and for a period he also had a carpentry workshop in Steinkjer. For the last 20 years of his professional life, he was employed as a draftsman for the military at Akershus Fortress in Oslo.

Mosling designed a number of churches in Norway, but due to his limited schooling, several of the drawings underwent extensive proofreading and adjustments by the architect Jacob Wilhelm Nordan who was the architect employed by the Ministry of Church Affairs.

Works
Brønnøy Church 
Dyrøy Church
Grong Church
Heggstad Church
Lebesby Church (burned down in 1944)
Levanger Church (burned down in 1877)
Meløy Church
Målselv Church 
Namsos Church (burned down in 1897)
Skjerstad Church (burned down in 1877)
Prestegård farmhouse in Buksnes
Sakshaug Church 
Telegraph station in Rørvik

References

External links
Photo and biography 

1840 births
1914 deaths

Norwegian ecclesiastical architects